"Revolution 909" is an instrumental track from Daft Punk's 1997 album Homework. It was released as the fifth and final single from the album in 1998. The music video for the track was directed by Roman Coppola.

Theme
The opening skit in "Revolution 909" is said to be a reflection on the French government and its stance against rave parties. When asked on the motivations of the stance, Bangalter said:

Music video
The music video for this track shows a rave taking place in an alley. Police officers suddenly arrive to break up the party. While several people are rounded up, a young woman who looks to be captured notices a stain on an officer's shirt. This triggers a flashback beginning with a tomato seed being planted, then sprouting, then harvested and then packaged. The packages are eventually transported to a grocery store where a lady selects the tomatoes to take home with her.  As she is preparing tomato sauce, subtitles accurately instruct the viewer on the recipe for making the sauce for spaghetti. The lady places the prepared meal into a tupperware container. The officer from earlier in the video appears with the meal in his squad car. He dribbles the tomato sauce onto his shirt while eating it and creates the stain. This brings the flashback to the beginning of the video. When the officer looks down at his stained shirt and is distracted, the young woman gains the opportunity to flee. Someone appears on a platform above and pulls her to safety.

The music video is featured in D.A.F.T., a collection of videos from Homework.  It is also available on the limited edition CD and DVD of Musique Vol. 1 1993–2005. Roman Coppola's audio commentary for "Revolution 909" in D.A.F.T. mentions friends of his who saw the video and noticed a person resembling Thomas Bangalter. He would not confirm if it was Bangalter or not. Coppola also refers to the video as the "tomato video". He stated that he used the tomato setting because he had always wanted to produce an instructional video.

Track listing

Charts

References 

Songs about revolutions
1997 songs
1998 singles
Daft Punk songs
Music videos directed by Roman Coppola